Dicks is a surname of the English West Midlands, Scotland, and Wales.  It ranks 6,404 in frequency in the United States, out of 88,799.

Some notable individuals with the surname Dicks include:

 Alan Dicks (born 1934), retired English footballer and manager
 Arthur Frederick Dicks (1935–1994), Australian actor and theater designer
 David Dicks (born 1978), Australian sailor
 John Dicks (actor) (born 1947), English film and television actor
 Julian Dicks (born 1968), British footballer and manager
 Norman D. Dicks (born 1940), U.S. Representative for Washington's 6th district
 Paul Dicks (born 1950), Canadian lawyer and former politician in Newfoundland
 Peter Dicks (born 1942), English investment manager and venture capitalist
 Pete Dicks (born 1953), Radio presenter of ‘BeatlesandBeyond’ Radio programme,  and others
 Philip Dicks (born 1962), former English cricketer
 Terrance Dicks (1935–2019), English writer
 Terry Dicks (born 1937), British Conservative Party politician

See also
 Dick (surname)
 Dix (disambiguation)

References 

English-language surnames